Outey II (1740 – 1777) was king of Cambodia from 1758-1775. He reigned under the name of Outeyreachea II, Reameathipadei IV or Neareayreachea II.

Outey was the oldest son of Prince Outeyreachea (1707 - 1753) and Princess Peou, a daughter of King Ang Em, which made him heir to both rival branches of the Varman dynasty, since Outey's grandfather was King Ang Tong, who had ruled Cambodia.

When Outey was born in 1740, one year after the Vietnamese were expelled by the Siamese army, Chey Chettha's son King Thommo Reachea was ruling Cambodia for the third time in his life, until he died in 1747. Thommo Reachea son and heir was murdered by a brother, the ministers chose a third brother as King, Ang Tong in 1748, but after being attacked by his relative Satha and a Vietnamese army, he fled to Siam. During his exile, the people in Cambodia drove out the Vietnamese once again, and chose Chey Chettha V as King, who after ruling Cambodia for six years, died in 1755, when Outey's grandfather Ang Tong once again was elected King.

Ang Tong died in Pursat in 1757 and Outey became King in 1758, after his grandfather Ang Tong's death.

Outey chose to rule under the protection of the Vietnamese, refused to help the Siamese king Taksin and provoked the Siamese king by calling him "half-Chinese", resulting in Siam sending an army in 1769, during which second invasion he fled to Vietnam in 1771, but returned later, and was reestablished as puppet king in Oudong by a Vietnamese army. A year later he had to flee to Vietnam again.

He returned once again in 1772, and reigned again, under the supervision of a Vietnamese official. Because King Outey II reduced his support of Siamese king Taksin, and after provocations Taksin invaded Cambodia, burned down Phnom Penh, and after Outey abdicated, his cousin Ang Non II was elected king in 1775.

Outey received the title Maha Upayuvaraja after his abdication. The title meant "Great Joint King" and was usually borne by kings who had abdicated but retained executive powers. In return, Outey's elder brother Ang Tham was crowned as Maha Uparaja the title of heir apparent. In Vietnamese records, Ang Non, Outey and Ang Tham were called the First King, the Second King and the Third King, respectively. However, this arrangement proved to be unsatisfactory. Both Outey and Ang Tam were assassinated in 1777, probably by Ang Non II.

Notes

Citations

References

Dauphin-Meunier, Achille, Histoire du Cambodge, P.U.F, Paris, 1968 Que sais-je ? N° 916.

Stokvis, Anthony, Manuel d'histoire, de généalogie et de chronologie de tous les États du globe, depuis les temps les plus reculés jusqu'à nos jours, préf. H. F. Wijnman, Leyde: 1888, Réédition 1966, Volume I Part 1: Asie, Chapitre XIV § 9 « Kambodge » Listes et Tableau Généalogique No. 34, .

18th-century Cambodian monarchs
Cambodian Buddhist monarchs
1796 deaths
1773 births
Monarchs who abdicated